FAM221B is a protein that in humans is encoded by the FAM221B gene

. FAM221B is also known by the alias C9orf128, is expressed at low level, and is defined by 17 GenBank accessions

. It is predicted to function in transcription regulation as a transcription factor.

Gene

Locus
FAM221B can be found around the end of the short arm of human chromosome 9.

Expression patterns
FAM221B is expressed at low levels in human and mouse tissues. Expression is highest in germ cell tissues and cells. This differential expression is most pronounced in testes tissue. Compared to Homo sapiens, Mus musculus shows more differential expression of FAM221B in testes tissue

. Mature beta cells express FAM221B at higher rates than do fetal beta cells

.

mRNA

Alternative splicing and isoforms
FAM221B has a total of 5 transcript variants: the putative sequence, Isoform X1

, Isoform X2

, Isoform X3

, and Isoform X4. Isoform X4 does not exist in humans but is found in various primates.

Exons

There are a total of six exons in the putative sequence of FAM221B. However, a total of seven exons exist for FAM221B, as the seventh exon is an alternative exon.

Protein

General characteristics
The putative sequence for FAM221B is 402 amino acids long and weighs 45.4 kilodaltons. Amino acids expressed at abnormal rates include Histidine, Cysteine, Glutamic acid, and Tyrosine. When compared to typical proteins, FAM221B expresses Histidine at a much higher frequency at 6.0% of protein, Cysteine at a slightly higher frequency at 4.7% of protein, Glutamic acid at a slightly higher frequency at 11.4% of protein, and Tyrosine at a slightly lower frequency at 1.0% of protein

. The isoelectric point of FAM221B is 5.264, suggesting FAM221B is an acidic protein at a normal physiological pH (7.4)

. There is strong evidence that FAM221B is a protein found within the nucleus

.

Compositional features
FAM221B is predicted to have two distinct alpha helices in its secondary structure

. Secondary structure predicting programs predict beta sheets but are not as consistent as the two alpha helices.

Post-translational modifications
FAM221B is predicted to have a high number of phosphorylation sites.

Protein interactions
There is evidence that FAM221B interacts with the proteins Autophagy related 13 (KIAA0652), RB1-inducible coiled-coil 1 (RB1CC1), and Ephrin-B3 (EFNB3)

.  These proteins are predicted to be localized in the nucleus at the same confidence level as FAM221B.

Homology and evolution
FAM221B is conserved in Eutheria. However, both orthologous and paralogous transcripts predating ancestral Boroeutheria can be found.

Paralogs
One paralog exists for FAM221B in humans: FAM221A

. FAM221A and FAM221B's ancestral gene is predicted to have diverged in prokarya.

Orthologs

Homologous domains
There are three conserved domains within FAM221B: DUF4475 super family

, PRCC super family

, and Caprin-1_C

. DUF4475 is the most conserved domain of the three.

Clinical significance
FAM221B is linked to mutations in the RNA component of RNase MRP, which causes pleiotropic human disease cartilage–hair hypoplasia. Also, as patients with acute lymphoblastic leukemia often carry genetic alterations in the short arm of human chromosome 9, FAM221B has two consistent non-synonymous amino acid variations associated with the disease. In acute lymphoblastic leukemia patients, Histidine is substituted for an Arginine at position 345, and a Leucine is substituted for a Phenylalanine at position 277 of the protein.

References

Suggested reading

 
 
 

Genes on human chromosome 9